The Key of Croatia is a populist political party in Croatia, formed out of an anti-eviction group of the same name. The party changed its name on 21 May 2022 from its then name Human Shield (literally translated as "Living Wall") the group opposes foreclosures by occupying property and forming a "human shield", hence the name. The party was founded on 2 June 2011.

The party grew out of the organization that operated until 2014 as the Alliance for Change. The organization formed into a party ahead of the 2014–15 presidential election, supporting the candidacy of Ivan Vilibor Sinčić.

The party refuses to be characterized as being left or right and claims adherence to humanist values.

Ideology and principles 
The party has been described as having "praised the writings of David Icke" and "pushed a number of conspiracy theories about chemtrails and vaccinations". An article for the magazine Jacobin by Juraj Katalenac described the party as a populist group that "is often portrayed as part of the left, but it offers more conspiracies theories than progressive policies."

The party believes that the current monetary system is unfair and unsustainable because it is based on money as debt, i.e. all the money in circulation comes as a loan with an interest rate that never went into circulation (only principal did), which is, according to the party, the cause of many evictions in Croatia.

The party stands for:

 realization of the monetary sovereignty of the Republic of Croatia and the implementation of a non-credit monetary system;
 implementation of a fair and efficient judicial system, and in particular the prohibition of inhumane and unconstitutional enforcement procedures, enforcement of the only home and secret procedures of state bodies;
 respecting the dignity, freedoms and rights of citizens, regardless of religious and ethnic affiliation, age, gender or social status;
 the development of a just society, and especially the protection of citizens from the oppressive, corrupt and arbitrary actions of state bodies;
 protection of cultural and natural heritage and human environment;
 realization of the guaranteed rights of people to health care, education, social care, work, family and other rights;
 realization and protection of the rights of workers, people who live from work and on the basis of their work;
 implementation of renewable energy sources;
 protection of animal rights.

Electoral results

Presidential elections

Parliament (Sabor)

European Parliament

References

External links 
  

Human rights organizations based in Croatia
Political parties established in 2011
Eurosceptic parties in Croatia
Anti-globalization political parties
Cannabis in Croatia
Populist parties
Economic nationalism
Humanist parties
Secularism in Europe
Syncretic political movements